Theodore Newton may refer to:

Theodore Newton (actor) (1904–1963)
Theodore Duddell Newton, see Newton–Wigner localization

See also
Ted Newton, Beethoven character
Teddy Newton, artist